Ruellia rasa (syn. Eurychanes rasa Hiern) is a plant native to the Cerrado vegetation of Brazil.

External links
Arizona Flora and Fauna: Ruellia rasa

rasa
Flora of Brazil